"So Happy" is a 1989 studio album by Eddie Murphy.

So Happy may also refer to:

 "So Happy" (Theory of a Deadman song), 2008
 "So Happy" (Tony Moran song), featuring Jason Walker, 2016
 "So Happy" / "Send It", a 2021 single by Bliss n Eso

See also
 So Happy Together (disambiguation)
 Happy (disambiguation)